Geoffrey George Lockwood Hebden (14 July 1918 – 27 March 2000) was an English cricketer. Hebden was a right-handed batsman who bowled right-arm fast-medium.

Hebden made his first-class debut for Hampshire in the 1937 County Championship against Northamptonshire. Hebden played two matches for Hampshire in the 1937 season, the second of which came against Yorkshire.

After the Second World War and eleven years after Hebdens last first-class appearance, he returned to Hampshire for the 1948 season, playing two matches against Yorkshire and Surrey. Hebden played two final first-class matches for Hampshire in 1950 against Northamptonshire and in 1951 against Cambridge University.

In his first-class career, Hebden took only three wickets at a bowling average of 57.33 and scored 69 runs at a batting average of 8.62.

In 1952 Hebden joined Dorset, making his debut against Devon in the Minor Counties Championship. During the 1952 season, in a Minor Counties match against Cornwall at Penzance, Hebden made scores of 140 and 100*. Hebden played thirty Minor Counties Championship matches for Dorset, the last of which came in 1960 against Cornwall.

Hebden died at Rowledge, Hampshire on 27 March 2000.

Family
Hebden's father George Hebden represented Middlesex in first-class cricket.

References

External links
Geoffrey Hebden at Cricinfo
Geoffrey Hebden at CricketArchive

1918 births
2000 deaths
People from Chiswick
English cricketers
Hampshire cricketers
Dorset cricketers